Founded in 2002, the Atlantic Baseball Confederation Collegiate League is a 12-team collegiate summer baseball league composed of teams located throughout New Jersey.

The league President is Mike Kolesar.

The ABCCL aims to prepare collegiate baseball players for their spring seasons and to play professionally post-graduation. Many ABCCL alums have played in the major, minor, and independent baseball leagues.

Current teams

Notable alumni
Ryan Buchter, major league pitcher
Ryan Doherty, minor league pitcher
Ryan Doolittle, major league pitcher
Ryan Kalish, outfielder
Cole Kimball, pitcher 
Fernando Perez, outfielder
 Gordon Graceffo, minor league pitcher
 David Kubiak, minor league pitcher
 Joe Serrapica, minor league pitcher
 Howie Brey, minor league pitcher
 AJ Candelario, minor league pitcher
 Ron Marinaccio, major league pitcher
 Trey Dombroski, minor league pitcher
 Danny Wilkinson, minor league pitcher

Past champions 
 2022 - CGI Monsoons
 2021 - Union County Gamers
 2020 - Langan Falcons
 2019 - Freehold Clippers
 2018 - Ocean Giants
 2017 - New Brunswick Matrix
 2016 - Freehold Clippers
 2015 - Monmouth Monarchs
 2014 - Monmouth Monarchs
 2013 - Monmouth Monarchs
 2012 - Toms River Hurricanes
 2011 - Monmouth Monarchs
 2010 - Protocall Stars
 2009 - Monmouth Monarchs
 2008 - Manchester Yankees
 2007 - Jersey Shore Tides
 2006 - Freehold Clippers
 2005 - Toms River Black Sox
 2004 - Toms River Black Sox

League Awards  

2022
 MVP, Tyler Ruban, William Paterson (Monsoons)
 Cy Young, Orin Winslow, St. Thomas Aquinas (Legends)
2021
 MVP, Joe Brong, Saint Elizabeth University (Gamers)
 Cy Young, Dan Merkel, Wagner College (Elite)
2020
 Shore MVP, Justin Kapuscinski, Marist College (Langan)
 Shore Cy Young, Oliver McCarthy, Duke University (Langan)
 North MVP, Justin Johnson, Lafayette College (Gamers)
 North Cy Young, Ryan Monroy, Susquehanna University (Monsoons)

References
ABCCL Website
ABCCL Instagram

Summer baseball leagues
College sports in New Jersey
Baseball leagues in New Jersey
College baseball leagues in the United States
2002 establishments in New Jersey
Sports leagues established in 2002